The University of Texas Rio Grande Valley (UTRGV) Chess Program  is one of the major chess organizations in the Rio Grande Valley and an affiliate of the United States Chess Federation (USCF). It consists of the Chess Team and Chess Club. The UTRGV Chess Club has approximately 100 members, which include grandmaster Anton Kovalyov, Andrey Stukopin, Carlos Hevia, Vladimir Belous, International Masters Felix Ynojosa, Guillermo Vazquez, Joshua Ruiz and Yannick Kambrath. The UTRGV Chess Team is coached by Polish grandmaster Bartłomiej Macieja. The Chess Club provides students ranging from beginner to expert a place for them to improve their game. UTRGV Chess competes at the state, national and international levels. They also help promote chess around local communities.

Organization

The UTRGV Chess Team faculty consist of Head Coach grandmaster Bartłomiej Macieja, Program Coordinator grandmaster Aleksander Miśta, and Dr. Douglas Stoves. The UTRGV Chess Club faculty consists of Dr. Nancy Razo and President Manuel Gonzalez.

History
UTRGV Chess was established August 31, 2015.

National championships

In 2018 the UTRGV Chess Team won its first national championship   defeating the 5-time reigning national champs Webster University. In 2019, the UTRGV Chess Team successfully defended its title to win once again. In 2019, they also won the 2019 National Collegiate Rapid Chess Championship

Awards and honors
Proclamation of the City of Brownsville, Texas	November, 2019
Chess College of the Year August, 2019
The State of Texas Governor Recognition	May, 2019
The Texas State Senate Resolution	May, 2019
The Texas House of Representatives Resolution	May, 2019
UT Board of Regents Recognition	May, 2019
Chess College of the Year	August, 2018
Proclamation of the Hidalgo County	May, 2018
Proclamation of the City of Brownsville, Texas	May, 2018
Proclamation by City of Edinburg, Texas	April, 2018
Letter from Senator Ted Cruz	March, 2018
Letter from Congressman Vicente Gonzalez	January, 2018
Proclamation of The City Commission of Brownsville TX	Spring, 2016
The Texas House of Representatives Resolution	Fall, 2015
The Texas State Senate Proclamation 	Fall, 2015
The US Chess Federation named Brownsville as the 2014 Chess City of the Year	2014
Accomplishments UTB - Legacy Institution	2002-2015

Team tournaments

References

External links
 UTRGV Chess website

Chess clubs in the United States
University of Texas Rio Grande Valley
2015 establishments in Texas